Gunfight at Comanche Creek is a 1963 American Western film directed by Frank McDonald and starring Audie Murphy.

Plot

A gang of Colorado bank robbers led by Amos Troop (DeForest Kelley) uses a technique where they break prisoners out of jail, use them to commit crimes, then later kill them to collect the reward. A detective, Gifford (Audie Murphy), goes undercover with the gang to bring them to justice.

Saloon owner Abbie Stevens takes a liking to Gifford while he infiltrates the gang. So does a young outlaw, Kid Carter, who goes to the town's marshal to get help for Gifford, only to discover the marshal's actually the ringleader of the gang. Help arrives in the nick of time, and Gifford guns down Troop and his men.

Cast
 Audie Murphy as Bob Gifford aka Judd Tanner
 Ben Cooper as Carter
 Colleen Miller as Abbie Stevens
 De Forest Kelley as Amos Troop
 Jan Merlin as Nielson
 Adam Williams as Jed Hayden 
 Susan Seaforth as Jamie
 Mort Mills as Ben Bady
 John Hubbard as Marshal Shearer
 John Milford as Bill Peters
 Michael Mikler as Rene Waller
 Thomas Browne Henry as Mike O'Bryant
 William Wellman Jr. as Day
 Laurie Mitchell as Tina Neville
 Tim Graham as Stage Driver
 Eddie Quillan as Hotel Clerk

See also
List of American films of 1963

References

External links
 
 

1963 films
1963 Western (genre) films
American Western (genre) films
Audie Murphy
Allied Artists films
Remakes of American films
Films directed by Frank McDonald
1960s English-language films
1960s American films